This list contains a list of  sub-classes for the seventh group of Enzyme Commission numbers, EC 7, translocases, placed in numerical order as determined by the Nomenclature Committee of the International Union of Biochemistry and Molecular Biology.  All official information is tabulated at the website of the committee. The database is developed and maintained by Andrew McDonald.

EC 7.1: Catalysing the translocation of hydrons

EC 7.1.1: Linked to oxidoreductase reactions
 : proton-translocating NAD(P)+ transhydrogenase * 
 : NADH:ubiquinone reductase (H+-translocating) * 
 : ubiquinol oxidase (H+-transporting) * 
 : caldariellaquinol oxidase (H+-transporting) * 
 : menaquinol oxidase (H+-transporting) * 
 : plastoquinol—plastocyanin reductase * 
 : quinol oxidase (electrogenic, proton-motive force generating) * 
 : quinol—cytochrome-c reductase * 
 : cytochrome-c oxidase * 
 : ferredoxin—quinone oxidoreductase (H+-translocating) * 
 : ferredoxin—NAD+ oxidoreductase (H+-transporting) *
 * No Wikipedia article

EC 7.1.2: Linked to the hydrolysis of a nucleoside triphosphate
 : P-type H+-exporting transporter *	 
 : H+-transporting two-sector ATPase *
 * No Wikipedia article

EC 7.1.3: Linked to the hydrolysis of diphosphate
 : H+-exporting diphosphatase *
 : Na+-exporting diphosphatase *
 * No Wikipedia article

EC 7.2: catalysing the translocation of inorganic cations and their chelates

EC 7.2.1: Linked to oxidoreductase reactions
 : NADH:ubiquinone reductase (NAD+-transporting) *	 
 : ferredoxin—NAD+  oxidoreductase (NAD+-transporting) *
 : ascorbate ferrireductase (transmembrane) *
 * No Wikipedia article

EC 7.2.2: Linked to the hydrolysis of a nucleoside triphosphate
 : Na+-transporting two-sector ATPase * 
 : ABC-type Cd2+ transporter * 
 : P-type Na+ transporter * 
 : ABC-type Na+ transporter * 
 : ABC-type Mn2+ transporter * 
 : P-type K+ transporter * 
 : ABC-type Fe2+ transporter * 
 : P-type Cu+ transporter * 
 : P-type Cu2+ transporter * 
 : P-type Ca2+ transporter * 
 : ABC-type Ni2+ transporter * 
 : P-type Zn2+ transporter * 
 : Na+/K+-exchanging ATPase * 
 : P-type Mg2+ transporter * 
 : P-type Ag+ transporter * 
 : ABC-type ferric hydroxamate transporter * 
 : ABC-type ferric enterobactin transporter * 
 : ABC-type ferric citrate transporter * 
 : H+/K+-exchanging ATPase * 
 : ABC-type Zn2+ transporter * 
 : Cd2+-exporting ATPase * 
 : P-type Mn2+ transporter * 
 * No Wikipedia article

EC 7.2.4: Linked to decarboxylation
 : carboxybiotin decarboxylase
 : oxaloacetate decarboxylase (Na+ extruding) *
 : (S)-methylmalonyl-CoA decarboxylase (sodium-transporting) *
 : biotin-dependent malonate decarboxylase *
 : glutaconyl-CoA decarboxylase * 
 * No Wikipedia article

EC 7.3: Catalysing the translocation of inorganic anions

EC 7.3.2: Linked to the hydrolysis of a nucleoside triphosphate
 : ABC-type phosphate transporter *
 : ABC-type phosphonate transporter *
 : ABC-type sulfate transporter *
 : ABC-type nitrate transporter *
 : ABC-type molybdate transporter *
 : ABC-type tungstate transporter *
 : arsenite-transporting ATPase *
 * No Wikipedia article

EC 7.4: Catalysing the translocation of amino acids and peptides

EC 7.4.2: Linked to the hydrolysis of a nucleoside triphosphate
 : ABC-type polar-amino-acid transporter *
 : ABC-type nonpolar-amino-acid transporter *
 : mitochondrial protein-transporting ATPase *
 : chloroplast protein-transporting ATPase *
 : bacterial ABC-type protein transporter *
 : ABC-type oligopeptide transporter *
 : ABC-type α-factor-pheromone transporter *
 : protein-secreting ATPase *
 : ABC-type dipeptide transporter *
 : ABC-type glutathione transporter *
 : ABC-type methionine transporter *
 : ABC-type cystine transporter *
 : ABC-type tyrosine transporter *
 : ABC-type antigen peptide transporter *
 * No Wikipedia article

EC 7.5: Catalysing the translocation of carbohydrates and their derivatives

EC 7.5.2: Linked to the hydrolysis of a nucleoside triphosphate
 :  ABC-type maltose transporter *
 :  ABC-type oligosaccharide transporter *
 :  ABC-type β-glucan transporter *
 :  ABC-type teichoic-acid transporter * 
 :  ABC-type lipopolysaccharide transporter *
 :  ABC-type lipid A-core oligosaccharide transporter *
 :  ABC-type D-ribose transporter *
 :  ABC-type D-allose transporter *
 :  ABC-type D-galactofuranose transporter *
 :  ABC-type D-xylose transporter *
 :  ABC-type D-galactose transporter *
 :  ABC-type L-arabinose transporter *
 :  ABC-type D-xylose/L-arabinose transporter *
 * No Wikipedia article

EC 7.6: Catalysing the translocation of other compounds

EC 7.6.2: Linked to the hydrolysis of a nucleoside triphosphate
 : P-type phospholipid transporter *
 : ABC-type xenobiotic transporter *
 : ABC-type glutathione-S-conjugate transporter *
 : ABC-type fatty-acyl-CoA transporter *
 : ABC-type heme transporter *
 : ABC-type guanine transporter *
 : ABC-type taurine transporter *
 : ABC-type vitamin B12 transporter *
 : ABC-type quaternary amine transporter *
 : ABC-type glycerol 3-phosphate transporter *
 : ABC-type polyamine transporter *
 : ABC-type capsular-polysaccharide transporter *
 : ABC-type autoinducer-2 transporter *
 : ABC-type aliphatic sulfonate transporter *
 : ABC-type thiamine transporter *
 : ABC-type putrescine transporter *
 * No Wikipedia article

:

References

Translocases
EC7